Steven Moore MBE is a former British World Water-Ski Racing world champion. He attained this title at the Australian World Championships in 1988.

References

British water skiers
Living people
Year of birth missing (living people)
Place of birth missing (living people)